Stigmella bumbegerensis is a moth of the family Nepticulidae. It is known from Bojan-Chongor Aimak in Mongolia.

External links
Nepticulidae and Opostegidae of the world

Nepticulidae
Moths of Asia
Moths described in 1984